In algebraic topology, a locally constant sheaf on a topological space X is a sheaf  on X such that for each x in X, there is an open neighborhood U of x such that the restriction  is a constant sheaf on U. It is also called a local system. When X is a stratified space, a constructible sheaf is roughly a sheaf that is locally constant on each member of the stratification.

A basic example is the orientation sheaf on a manifold since each point of the manifold admits an orientable open neighborhood (while the manifold itself may not be orientable.)

Then the kernel of P is a locally constant sheaf on  but not constant there (since it has no nonzero global section).

If  is a locally constant sheaf of sets on a space X, then each path  in X determines a bijection  Moreover, two homotopic paths determine the same bijection. Hence, there is the well-defined functor

where  is the fundamental groupoid of X: the category whose objects are points of X and whose morphisms are homotopy classes of paths. Moreover, if X is path-connected, locally path-connected and semi-locally simply connected (so X has a universal cover), then every functor  is of the above form; i.e., the functor category  is equivalent to the category of locally constant sheaves on X.

If X is locally connected, the adjunction between the category of presheaves and bundles restricts to an equivalence between the category of locally constant sheaves and the category of covering spaces of X.

References

External links 

https://golem.ph.utexas.edu/category/2010/11/locally_constant_sheaves.html (recommended)

Algebraic topology
Topological spaces